The 13th IAAF World Championships in Athletics was an international athletics competition that was held in Daegu, South Korea. It started on 27 August 2011 and finished on 4 September 2011.

The United States topped the medal standings in the competition with 28 (12 gold, 9 silver, and 7 bronze). During the competition, 41 national records, 4 area records, 3 championship records, and 1 world record was set.

Bidding process 

On 4 April 2006, the IAAF announced that nine countries (United States, South Korea, Australia, Sweden, Spain, Russia, the United Arab Emirates, Croatia and Morocco) had submitted expressions of interest for hosting the 2011 World Championships.

Candidates 
When the seeking deadline passed on 1 December 2006, four candidate cities (Brisbane, Daegu, Moscow and Gothenburg) had confirmed their candidatures. Gothenburg backed out later that month, citing lack of financial support from the Swedish government.

Brisbane was announced as the Australian candidate with the Queensland Sport and Athletics Centre (formally ANZ Stadium) as the proposed venue for a championships to be held in July or August. The stadium previously hosted the 1982 Commonwealth Games and 2001 Goodwill Games. Brisbane also had an unsuccessful bid for the 2009 World Championships in Athletics.

Daegu was the city chosen for the Korean bid, following on from an initial application to host the 2009 edition. Daegu had previously hosted the 2003 Summer Universiade and three matches of the 2002 FIFA World Cup. The World Championships in Athletics had never been staged in mainland Asia, although it has taken place twice in Japan.

The Russian bid had Moscow's Luzhniki Stadium as the proposed venue. The city hosted the 1980 Summer Olympics and the 2006 IAAF World Indoor Championships.

Among the intent candidates were Casablanca (Morocco) and Split (Croatia), both of which were failed bidders for the 2009 World Championships in Athletics. The Spanish candidate was rumored to be either Madrid or Valencia, but Spain eventually settled for Barcelona as a candidate for the 2013 World Championships in Athletics. The United States intent candidate city matched those bidding for the 2016 Summer Olympics: Chicago, Los Angeles or San Francisco.

Selection
The IAAF announced Daegu as the winning candidate at the IAAF Council Meeting in Mombasa on 27 March 2007. Its victory was based on "the quality of the stadiums and [meeting] the need for good crowds." IAAF's officials also praised Daegu's "ambition and challenging spirit" as key to its winning bid. Both Moscow and Brisbane later confirmed their candidacy to host the 2013 World Championships in Athletics – a selection process won by the Russian capital.

Event schedule 

All dates are KST (UTC+9)

Results

Men 
The events in the men's section ended with a world record in 4 x 100 metres relay set by Jamaica and several world's leading results. Jamaica dominated the sprinting events, while Kenya and Ethiopia dominated the longer track events. In the field events, the United States and Germany were most successful, winning four and three gold medals respectively. Yohan Blake and Usain Bolt, both from Jamaica, won two gold medals, being the most successful athletes in the men's events.

In the 100 m final the largely favored Usain Bolt was disqualified for a false start, enabling Yohan Blake to win the crown with a time of 9.92 s. In the 200 m Bolt won with a time of 19.40 s, which was the fastest time ever not to be a world record at that point. Blake and Bolt, along with countrymen Nesta Carter and Michael Frater, ran in the 4 x 100 metres relay, setting a new world record with a time of 37.04 s. In the 10,000 metres event, World Champion Kenenisa Bekele did not finish the race. The world record holder in 800 m, David Rudisha, won the event with his first gold medal at the World Championships. On the last day, Kenyan Abel Kirui became the third marathon winner to retain the title at the next World Championships, after Abel Anton and Jaouad Gharib.

Most of the field events ended with new winners, but Dwight Phillips retained the long jump title, becoming only the second man after Ivan Pedroso to win four golds at the World Championships in this event.

Ethiopia's Imane Merga was originally awarded the bronze medal in the Men's 5000 metres, but he was later disqualified for having run inside the curb of the running track for some 10 to 15 metres. His teammate Dejen Gebremeskel was elevated to the bronze medal as a result.

Cuba's Dayron Robles finished first in the race of the Men's 110 metres hurdles, but was disqualified for interfering with Liu Xiang twice before and over the last barrier. Jason Richardson was awarded the Gold, Liu the Silver, and Andy Turner promoted to the Bronze medal position.

Track

Field

Women 
During the championships, Russia was the most successful country in the women's events, winning seven gold medals, followed by the United States with six. Most successful female athlete was Allyson Felix having won two relay golds and silver and bronze in her individual events. On the first day of the Championships, the athletes of Kenya made an astonishing performance, winning all six medals available in the two events. Kenya also dominated the long-distance events, while Jamaica and the United States the sprinting. In the field events, Russia was dominant, winning four gold medals.

Following a series of retests of stored samples and biological passports, a number of athletes were stripped of medals because of doping.

Track

Field 

 Original gold medalist Mariya Abakumova of  Russia was stripped of her gold medal.
 Original gold medalist Tatyana Chernova of  Russia was stripped of her gold medal on 29 November 2016 by the Court of Arbitration for Sport, with Ennis and Oeser promoted to gold and silver respectively and the bronze awarded to Karolina Tymińska of Poland.

Anti-doping programme
On 4 November 2011 the IAAF reported that 2 of the 468 urine samples had produced adverse analytical findings. The samples of Portuguese runner Sara Moreira, a finalist in the women's steeplechase, and Korean relay runner Hee-Nam Lim had both tested positive for methylhexaneamine. Analysis of blood samples is still ongoing.

In March 2012 the Trinidad and Tobago track and field authorities announced that Semoy Hackett had tested positive for methylhexaneamine at the Trinidad and Tobago national championships prior to the World Championships. Her results in the women's 100 metres were annulled and the Trinidadian 4 x 100-metre relay team were also disqualified from fourth place.

An anonymous poll conducted by the World Anti-Doping Agency at the event showed that an estimated 29% of the athletes present at the World Championships had used a banned substance within the last 12 months.

Medal table 

Originally, host nation South Korea failed to win any medals at these championships, a fate shared with Sweden in 1995 and Canada in 2001.

However, in 2015, South Korean athlete Kim Hyun-sub was promoted from sixth place to bronze medalist in the 20 km walk after three Russian race walkers were disqualified for doping offences.

Key

Participating nations 
On the entry lists prior to the competition, a total of 1943 athletes from 202 national teams were set to participate in the 2011 World Championships in Athletics. The number of accredited athletes that actually participated at the event was 1848, while the total of countries represented was 204.

 
 
 
 
 
 
 
 
 
 
 
 
 
 
 
 
 
 
 
 
 
 
 
 
 
 
 
 
 
 
 
 
 
 
 
 
 
 
 
 
 
 
 
 
 
 
 
 
 
 
 
 
 
 
 
 
 
 
 
 
 
 
 
 
 
 
 
 
 
 
 
 
 
 
 
 
 
 
 
 
 
 
 
 
 
 
 
 
 
 
 
 
 
 
 
 
 
 
  (Hosts)

See also 

 2011 IPC Athletics World Championships

References

External links 

 Website for the IAAF World Championships in Athletics – Daegu 2011 
 IAAF's Championship website
 Entry Standards (IAAF)
 Coverage and News at the Guardian
 Flotrack Race Interviews with athletes and Race Videos

 
World Athletics Championships
World Championships in Athletics
World Championships in Athletics
Sports competitions in Daegu
International athletics competitions hosted by South Korea
August 2011 sports events in South Korea
September 2011 sports events in South Korea